Robert Maloney may refer to:

Robert S. Maloney (1881–1934), U.S. Representative from Massachusetts
Robert Maloney (doctor) (born 1958), American ophthalmologist and doctor on TV series Extreme Makeover
Robert B. Maloney (born 1933), U.S. federal judge
 Robert Maloney (baseball) (1856–1908), baseball player